This is a list of numbered county roads in Lennox and Addington County, Ontario.

Lennox and Addington